Roads are an important mode of transport in India. At of roads per square kilometre of land, the quantitative density of India's road network is equal to that of Hong Kong, and substantially higher than the United States, China, Brazil and Russia. India's road network carries over 71 percent of its freight and about 85 percent of passenger traffic.

Since the 1990s, major efforts have been underway to modernize the country's road infrastructure. As of 31 March 2020, 70.00% of Indian roads were paved. Major projects are being implemented under the Bharatmala, a government initiative. Private builders and highway operators are also implementing major projects.

Organization

The Indian road network is administered by various government authorities, given India's federal form of government. The following table shows the total length of India's road network by type of road and administering authority

History 
The first evidence of road development in the Indian subcontinent can be traced back to approximately around 2800 BC in the ancient cities of Harrapa and Mohenjodaro of the Indus Valley civilization. Ruling emperors and monarchs of ancient and medieval India continued to construct roads to connect the cities. The existing Grand Trunk Road was re-built by the Mauryan Empire, and further rebuilt by subsequent entities such as the Sur Empire, the Mughal Empire and the British Empire.

In the 1830s, the British East India Company started a programme of metalled road construction ( gravel road), for both commercial and administrative purposes. The Grand Trunk Road – from Calcutta, through Delhi to Peshawar – was rebuilt at a cost of £1,000 per mile; roads from Bombay to Pune, Bombay to Agra and Bombay to Madras were constructed; and a Public Works Department and the Indian Institute of Technology Roorkee were founded, to train and employ local surveyors, engineers and overseers, to perform the work, and to maintain the roads. This programme resulted in an estimated  of metalled roads being constructed by the 1850s.

In December 1934, the Indian Road Congress (IRC) was formed, on the recommendations of the Indian Road Development Committee (Jayakar Committee) of the Government of India. The construction was to be paid in part through the duty imposed, since 1939, on petrol sales. This became known as the Nagpur Plan. The construction target was achieved in the late 1950s. In 1956, a Highways Act was passed, and a second twenty-year plan proposed for the period 1961–1981, with the ambition of doubling road density to 32 km per 100 km2. This second plan became known as the Bombay Road Plan.

In 1988, an autonomous entity called the National Highways Authority of India (NHAI) was established by an Act of Parliament and came into existence on 15 June 1989. The Act empowered NHAI to develop, maintain and manage India's road network through National Highways. However, little happened until India introduced widespread economic liberalization in the early 1990s. Since 1995, NHAI has increasingly privatized road network development in India.

In 1998, National Highways Development Project (NHDP) was started by the then Prime Minister Atal Bihari Vajpayee. In January 2012, India announced that the four-lane GQ highway network was complete.

Another important road project of the NHDP is the  four-to-six-lane North–South and East–West Corridor, comprising national highways connecting four extreme points of the country. The project aims to connect Srinagar in the north to Kanyakumari in the south (including a spur from Salem to Kanyakumari, via Coimbatore and Kochi), and Silchar in the east to Porbandar in the west. As of 31 October 2016, 90.99% of the project had been completed, 5.47% of the project work is under implementation and 3.52% of the total length is remaining.

The National Highways and Infrastructure Development Corporation Limited (NHIDCL) is a Public Sector Enterprise(PSE) created by Ministry of Road Transport and Highways, Government of India in the year 2014 to build highways in technical challenging and high altitude regions of Northeastern states, Uttarakhand, Jammu and Kashmir, Ladakh and Andaman & Nicobar Islands. It has the task to implement the Special Accelerated Road Development Programme for North Eastern Region (SARDP-NE) in National Highways portion. The SARDP-NE is under implementation in Phases.

 Phase-A: Approved in 2005, it included about 4,099 km length of roads (3,014 km of NH and 1,085 km of State roads). The SARDP-NE Phase ‘A’ is expected to be completed by 2023–24.
 Phase-B: It covers 3,723 km (2,210 km NHs and 1,513 km of State roads) of road. Phase ‘B’ of SARDP-NE shall be taken up after completion of Phase ‘A’.

In 2021, Asia's longest high speed track, National Automotive Test Track was inaugurated in Indore, which would be used to measure the maximum speed capabilities of high-end cars and other categories of vehicles.

India's rate of road building has accelerated since 2010s. The country's target is to build  of highways per day.

Types of roads

Expressways

Expressways are high-speed roads that are four- or more lanes, and are access controlled where entrance and exit is controlled by the use of ramps that are incorporated into the design of the expressway. Most of the existing expressways in India are toll roads. The government has drawn up a target to build a  network of new expressways by 2022.

National Expressways Authority of India (NEAI) operating under the Ministry of Road Transport and Highways will be in-charge of the construction and maintenance of expressways. The NHAI by Government of India aims to expand the expressway network and plans to add an additional  of expressways by 2022 apart from existing national highways.

India's first 8-lane wide access-controlled expressway, the Delhi Noida Direct Flyway (DND Flyway), operational in January 2001, is an expressway connecting Delhi and Noida in the states of Delhi and Uttar Pradesh. The Mumbai Pune Expressway, connecting Mumbai and Pune in Maharashtra fully operational in 2002, is India's first 6-lane wide access-controlled tolled expressway. The Yamuna Expressway is a  six-lane controlled-access expressway opened on 9 August 2012. On 21 November 2016, the  six-lane Agra Lucknow Expressway was opened. Under construction as of 2019, the Mumbai–Nagpur Expressway is expected to become the largest expressway in the country. Several expressway projects, such as the Chennai-Bangalore Expressway, Chennai-Salem Expressway, Delhi-Jaipur Expressway, Lucknow-Kanpur Expressway are planned/under-construction. Ganga Expressway is approved and expected to be under-construction by end of 2021.

National highways

National highways are highways connecting major cities throughout the country with premium quality and are at-grade roads. National Highways are designated with NH, followed by the highway number. Indian national highways are further classified based on the width of the carriageway of the highway. National Highways constituted 2.7% of India's total road network, but carried about 40% of road traffic, as of 2013. In 2016, the government vowed to double the highway length from 96,000 to 2,00,000 km.

The National Highways Authority of India (NHAI) and the National Highways and Infrastructure Development Corporation Limited (NHIDCL) are the authorities responsible for the development, maintenance and management of the National Highways in India. The NHAI has been undertaking developmental activities under the National Highways Development Project (NHDP) in five phases. From 2018, the pending projects under NHDP are expected to be subsumed under Bharatmala. The NHAI is also responsible for implementing other projects on National Highways, primarily road connectivity to major ports in India.

The Golden Quadrilateral and North–South and East–West Corridor were major ongoing highway development projects in India.

State highways

State highways are highways connecting major cities throughout a state and are also at-grade roads. They also connect with National Highways or state highways of neighboring states. State Highways are designated with SH, followed by the highway number and preceded by state code. As of 31 March 2020, Maharashtra has the largest share of state highways among all states (22.14%), followed by Karnataka (11.11%), Gujarat (9.76%), Rajasthan (8.62%) and Tamil Nadu (6.67%).

State governments have the authority and responsibility to build state highways. Most of the state highways are developed by state public works departments. Independently of the Bharatmala program, state governments have been implementing a number of state highway projects since 2000. By 2010, state highway projects worth US$1.7 billion had been completed, and projects worth an additional US$11.4 billion were under implementation.

District roads

Zila Parishads also have the authority and responsibility to build district roads.

Rural roads 

Rural roads form a substantial portion of the country's road network, forming 72.97% of the total of roads, as of March 2020. As of the same date, the percentage of unsurfaced roads to the total road length was 31%.

For the development of these rural roads, Pradhan Mantri Gram Sadak Yojana (Prime Minister's Rural Roads Scheme) was launched in December 2000 by the Indian government to provide connectivity to isolated rural habitations. The scheme envisions that these roads will be constructed and maintained by the village panchayats. In some parts of India, the government has attempted to manage the programme directly as a local social spending program.

The effort has aimed to build all-season single-lane asphalted roads to connect India's rural and remote areas. A significant portion of funding for these projects has come from the World Bank and the Asian Development Bank.

Border roads 
Border Roads are the roads constructed along the northern and northeastern borders of our country. These roads are constructed and maintained by Border Roads Organisation (BRO) which was set up in 1960 by the government of India. BRO is regarded as a symbol of nation building, national integration and an inseparable component in maintaining the security of the country.

Congestion

India's intra-city vehicle speed is among the lowest in the world.

Fatalities 
The World Health Organization's compilation of road network safety data for major economies found India to have the highest number of road fatalities in the world, with 299,091 deaths caused by road accidents in 2016. Also, fatalities per 100,000 population stay among the highest, at 22.6. Of total fatalities, 40% were of riders of 2 or 3 wheelers, 18% were of drivers and passengers of 4-wheeled cars and light vehicles, 18% were of drivers and passengers of buses and heavy trucks, 10% of pedestrians, 2% of cyclists and 13% of other.

See also

 Indian Roads Congress
 Transport in India
 List of National Highways in India
 2010 renumbering of National Highways in India
 Expressways of India

References

External links

 Classification of roads in India
 Impact of roads on the Sustainable Development Goals(SDGs) in India

 
Road transport in India